The Harris corner detector is a corner detection operator that is commonly used in computer vision algorithms to extract corners and infer features of an image. It was first introduced by Chris Harris and Mike Stephens in 1988 upon the improvement of Moravec's corner detector. Compared to the previous one, Harris' corner detector takes the differential of the corner score into account with reference to direction directly, instead of using shifting patches for every 45 degree angles, and has been proved to be more accurate in distinguishing between edges and corners. Since then, it has been improved and adopted in many algorithms to preprocess images for subsequent applications.

Introduction 

A corner is a point whose local neighborhood stands in two dominant and different edge directions.  In other words, a corner can be interpreted as the junction of two edges, where an edge is a sudden change in image brightness. Corners are the important features in the image, and they are generally termed as interest points which are invariant to translation, rotation and illumination. Although corners are only a small percentage of the image, they contain the most important features in restoring image information, and they can be used to minimize the amount of processed data for motion tracking, image stitching, building 2D mosaics, stereo vision, image representation and other related computer vision areas.

In order to capture the corners from the image, researchers have proposed many different corner detectors including the Kanade-Lucas-Tomasi (KLT) operator and the Harris operator which are most simple, efficient and reliable for use in corner detection. These two popular methodologies are both closely associated with and based on the local structure matrix. Compared to the Kanade-Lucas-Tomasi corner detector, the Harris corner detector provides good repeatability under changing illumination and rotation, and therefore, it is more often used in stereo matching and image database retrieval. Although there still exists drawbacks and limitations, the Harris corner detector is still an important and fundamental technique for many computer vision applications.

Development of Harris corner detection algorithm  

Without loss of generality, we will assume a grayscale 2-dimensional image is used. The sum of squared differences (SSD) between these two patches, denoted , is given by:

 can be approximated by a Taylor expansion.

This produces the approximation

which can be written in matrix form:

where M is the structure tensor,

Process of Harris corner detection algorithm 
Commonly, Harris corner detector algorithm can be divided into five steps.
 Color to grayscale
 Spatial derivative calculation
 Structure tensor setup
 Harris response calculation
 Non-maximum suppression

Color to grayscale 
If we use Harris corner detector in a color image, the first step is to convert it into a grayscale image, which will enhance the processing speed.

The value of the gray scale pixel can be computed as a weighted sums of the values R, B and G of the color image, 
, 

where, e.g.,

Spatial derivative calculation 

Structure tensor setup 

Harris response calculation
For , one has 

In this step, we compute the smallest eigenvalue of the structure tensor using that approximation:

 

with the trace . 

Another commonly used Harris response calculation is shown as below,

where  is an empirically determined constant;  .

Non-maximum suppression 
In order to pick up the optimal values to indicate corners, we find the local maxima as corners within the window which is a 3 by 3 filter.

Improvement 

 Harris-Laplace Corner Detector
 Differential Morphological Decomposition Based Corner Detector
 Multi-scale Bilateral Structure Tensor Based Corner Detector

Applications 
 Image Alignment, Stitching and Registration
 2D Mosaics Creation
 3D Scene Modeling and Reconstruction
 Motion Detection
 Object Recognition
 Image Indexing and Content-based Retrieval
 Video Tracking

See also 
 Structure tensor
 Harris affine region detector
 Corner detection
 Feature detection (computer vision)
 Computer vision
 List of computer vision topics

References

External links 
"Learn OpenCV by Examples : Harris Corner Detection"
"Harris Corner Detection - OpenCV Documentation" 
 
 Online Implementation of the Harris Corner Detector - IPOL

Computer vision